The 45th ceremony of the People's Choice Awards was held on November 10, 2019, to honor the best in popular culture for 2019.

Performers
 Alessia Cara - "Rooting for You"
 Kelsea Ballerini - "Club"

Winners and nominees
The first round of nominees was announced in August, with the finalists named on September 4.

Film

TV

Music

Pop culture

Other

People's Icon of 2019
 Jennifer Aniston

Most Inspiring Asian Woman of 2019
 CL

Fashion Icon of 2019
 Gwen Stefani

People's Champion of 2019
 Pink

References

November 2019 events in the United States
2019 awards in the United States
People's Choice Awards
2019 film awards
2019 music awards
2019 television awards
2019 in Los Angeles County, California